Saint Paul, Minnesota contains many educational institutions from grade school to high school, college and beyond.  A number of educational "firsts" have happened in Saint Paul.  Hamline University, the first and oldest college in Minnesota, was founded in Saint Paul in 1854.   In 1991 Minnesota became the first state in the United States to pass legislation allowing the existence of charter schools. The following year, the first charter school in the nation, City Academy High School, was established in Saint Paul. The oldest library in Minnesota, the Minnesota State Law Library, was opened in 1849.

Primary and secondary education

Public schools

Saint Paul Public Schools is the school district that serves the entire city.  It is the state's second largest school district with approximately 38,000 students. The district is also one of the most diverse in Minnesota.

There are also many charter schools that are run separately from the Saint Paul Public Schools, but are administered by the Minnesota Department of Education. 21 charter schools currently operate in Saint Paul.

Private schools
Saint Paul has numerous private schools, including non-sectarian, Jewish, Roman Catholic, and Protestant. The Minnesota Department of Education has no authority over private school operations; private schools may or may not be accredited, and achievement tests are not required for private school graduating seniors. Many private schools will obtain accreditation and perform achievement tests as a means of demonstrating that the school is genuinely interested in educational performance. Saint Paul is currently home to 38 private schools.

In addition, Catholic schools in Saint Paul are operated by the Roman Catholic Archdiocese of Saint Paul and Minneapolis. Three high schools and fourteen elementary schools are overseen by the archdiocese.

List of elementary and secondary schools

Primary

 Adams Spanish Immersion
 Ames Elementary
 Battle Creek Elementary
 Capitol Hill Gifted/Talented Magnet
 Community of Peace Academy
 Eastern Heights Elementary
 EXPO for Excellence Magnet Elementary School
 Four Seasons A+ Elementary
 Friends School of Minnesota
 Groveland Park Elementary
 Harambee Elementary
 Hayden Heights Elementary
 Horace Mann Elementary
 Jackson Preparatory Magnet
 L'Etoile du Nord French Immersion School
 Longfellow Humanities Elementary and Magnet School
 Nativity of Our Lord
 Nokomis Montessori Magnet
 North End Elementary
 Saint Anthony Park Elementary School
 St. John Lutheran School
 St. Pascal Baylon
 Webster Magnet Elementary
 (and more not listed)

Public Secondary

Central High School
Como Park Senior High School
Harding High School
Johnson Senior High School
Arlington Senior High School
Battle Creek Middle School
Cleveland Junior High School
Creative Arts Senior High School
Hazel Park Academy Middle School
Highland Park Junior High School
Highland Park Senior High School
Humboldt Junior High School
Humboldt Senior High School
Murray Junior High School
Open School
Ramsey Junior High School
Saint Paul Conservatory for the Performing Artists
Twin Cities Academy
Washington Technology Middle School

Private Secondary

Cretin-Derham Hall High School
St. Paul Academy and Summit School
Saint Bernard's High School
Saint Agnes High School
Hill-Murray High School
(and more not listed)

List of Post-Secondary schools
Saint Paul is second in the United States in the number of higher education institutions per capita.

Public Post-Secondary
Metropolitan State University
Saint Paul College - A community and technical college
University of Minnesota, Twin Cities

Private Post-Secondary

Bethel University (Currently located in Arden Hills although historically in St. Paul)
College of Saint Catherine
College of St. Scholastica
College of Visual Arts (Closed)
Concordia University, Saint Paul
Hamline University
Macalester College
McNally Smith College of Music
University of St. Thomas

Post-Graduate
William Mitchell College of Law
Luther Seminary
University of Minnesota - various Master's, Doctoral, and Professional programs, including Veterinary Medicine
Hamline University - Law School, Business School, and School of Education
Saint Paul Seminary School of Divinity
Metropolitan State University

References